"Dödel Up" is a 2000 song by Guano Apes. It is the fourth and final single from Don't Give Me Names, released on January 29, 2001 in Germany. Originally the post-grunge-influenced "I Want It" was going to be the fourth single as there was a video, however the band scrapped the video and chose to do "Dödel Up" instead. The music video for the single was a complete departure from the previous Apes music videos, as the video was purely animated, but blended with live footage. The video shows the band portrayed as half bodied pencil holders.

Track listing

CD single
Dödel Up (Single Edit) - 3:23
Cuts - 3:34
Candy Love - 3:33
Dödel Up (Kuklicz Mix) - 4:16
Dödel Up (Album Version) - 3:38
Multimedia Part (CD-ROM only, contains video for title track, sketches for video, early acoustic live version and weblinks)

Promo single
Dödel Up (Album Version) - 3:37
Dödel Up (U.S. Mix) - 3:36

Airplay single
Dödel Up (Single Edit) - 3:23
Dödel Up (Album Version) - 3:38

Charts

References

2001 singles
Guano Apes songs
2000 songs